Sylhet Gitika is the folklore of Sylhet region including the oral narrative poetry, stories, fables, etc. The source of Sylhet Gitika is considered to be the daily lifestyle of the ancient people of Sylhet region, the livelihood of the indigenous people, feudal system of governance, rural folklore, emotional feelings, love-separation, war and humanity. According to the list given by Professor Asaddor Ali, 120 folk tales have been included in the Sylhet Gitika.  The lyric poems collected by Chandra Kumar De from East Mymensingh and Sylhet region with the efforts of Dr. Dinesh Chandra Sen were published gradually from Calcutta University as Purbanga Gitika and Maimansingha Gitika. Besides, Chowdhury Gulam Akbar selected 10 lyric poems from Bangla Academy in 1986 and published them together as Sylhet Gitika.

Lyrics included in the Sylhet Gitika

See also 
Bangladeshi folk literature

Bengali literature

References 

Sylheti language
Sylheti literature
Sylhet Gitika